Lambros Konstantaras (13 March 1913 – 28 June 1985) was a Greek film actor.  He appeared in 80 films between 1940 and 1981. He was born and died in Athens.

Biography
He was born in 1913, in Kolonaki, Athens. He studied acting in Paris and graduated in 1933, making his theatre debut in France in 1937. The following year, he returned to Greece and worked in theatre. After working in several theatre groups he formed his own with Jenny Karezi, Maro Kontou and Nikos Rizos, often working together with such actresses as Ellie Lambeti, Aliki Vougiouklaki and others. However, Konstantaras was far better known as a film actor, playing leading roles in more than 80 movies. In cinema, he debuted in 1939 with the film The Parting Song, the first Greek sound film. In his youth, many of his roles were of a serious nature but later on in life he played almost exclusively comic roles usually as an executive or the father of the bride, etc. He cooperated with Alekos Sakellarios in many hits of decade 1950 and 1960 such as Alice in the Navy and Yparhei kai Filotimo. In 1969, he won the best leading actor award in Thessaloniki Festival of Greek Cinema, for the film O Blofatzis, directed by Vasilis Georgiadis. Lambros Konstantaras died on June 28, 1985, and is buried in the First Cemetery of Athens.

Selected filmography

 The Parting Song (1940) as Konstantis
 I foni tis kardias (1943) as Tzortzis
 Ragismenes kardies... (1945) as Alkis
 Prosopa lismonimena (1946) as Pavlos Kalvos
 Katadromi sto Aigaion (1946) as Capt. Alexis Komninos
 Marina (1947) as Vasos
 Anna Roditi (1948) as Aris Galanos
 Diagogi... miden! (1949) as Fotis
 Oi apahides ton Athinon (1950) as Kostas
 Ekeines pou den prepei n' agapoun... (1951) as Giorgos
 Apagogi stin Kriti (1951)
 Angelos me heiropedes (1952) as Petros
 Heaven Is Ours (1953) as Thanos Varlamos
 Oute gata oute zimia (1955) as Nikos Koutroubas
 Madame X (1955) as Stefanos Petridis
 The Lovers Arrive (1956) as Spyros Argyriou
 The Duchess of Plakendia (1956) as Karolos
 Maria Pentagiotissa (1957) as Georgios Armaos
 Syghorese me, paidi mou (1957)
 I moira grafei tin istoria (1957)
 Diakopes stin Aigina (1958) as Tzonis
 To trellokoritso (1958) as Papadopoulos
 Dyo agapes, dyo kosmoi (1958) as Costas Kosmidis
 To parastratima mias athoas (1959) as Alexis
 To agorokoritso (1959) as Father
 Taxeidi me ton erota (1959) as Labros
 Antio zoi (1960) as Stefanos Vranas
 Erotika paihnidia (1960) as Manos
 Eimai athoos (1960) as Colonel Georges Picquart
 Tyflos angelos (1960) as Kostas
 Moro mou! (1960) as Alexis Depastas
 Krouaziera sti Rodo (1960) as Petros Rambos
 Alice in the Navy (1961) as Commander
 I Liza kai i alli (1961) as Mikes Gavriiloglou
 Lathos ston erota (1961) as Antonis Mihalos
 Thriamvos (1962)
 Katigoroumenos... o eros (1962) as Ahilleas Karbantis
 Htypokardia sto thranio (1963) as Mr. Petrovasilis
 Mikroi kai megaloi en drasei (1963) as Antonis Zorbas
 O kos pterarhos (1963) as Wing Commander
 O babas mou ki ego! (1963) as Leon Mavrogiannis
 Kazanovas (1963) as Georges
 Afto to kati allo! (1963) as Nana's Father
 Tha se kano vasilissa (1964) as Pete Papatheofilopoulos
 I villa ton orgion (1964) as Haris Zavalos
 O eaftoulis mou (1964) as Giagos Angelis
 I chartopaichtra (1964) as Andreas Oikonomidis
 Epistrofi (1965) as Petros Valentis
 A Matter of Earnestness (1965) as Andreas Mavrogialouros
 Yie mou... Yie mou... (1965) as Antonis Hatziloukas
 Jenny Jenny (1966) as Miltos Kassandris
 My Daughter, the Socialist (1966) as Antonis Delvis
 I gynaika mou trellathike (1966) as Manos
 Na zi kaneis i na mi zi? (1966) as Giorgos Alexiou
 O spangorammenos (1967) as Labros Skoudris
 Dimitri mou... Dimitri mou (1967) (uncredited)
 Kati kourasmena palikaria (1967) as Dinos Diamandidis
 Viva Rena (1967) as Labros Fokas
 Patera, katse fronima... (1967) as Antonis Papastafidas
 O gerontokoros (1967) as Thanasis Baroutsos
 An oles oi gynaikes tou kosmou... (1967) as Angelis
 O striglos pou egine arnaki (1968) as Leonidas Petroheilos
 O trellos tahei 400 (1968) as Labros Labretas
 O romios ehei filotimo (1968) as Tilemahos Karadaris
 Kapetan fandis bastouni (1968) as Captain Andreas
 O blofatzis (1969) as Paraskevas Karatzovalos
 O tzanabetis (1969) as Neofytos Foteinos
 Isaia... mi horeveis (1969) as Isaias Stefanakis
 Krima... to boi sou (1970) as Marios Delipetrou
 Enas trellos glentzes (1970) as Panos Pambanos / Tikos
 Piso mou s' eho, satana (1971) as Pavlos Koundouras
 O faflatas (1971) as Dimosthenis Labroukos
 Tis zileias ta kamomata (1971) as Dimitris Karalis
 O trellopenintaris (1971) as Andreas Tependris
 Ti 30... ti 40... ti 50... (1972) as Zahos Fokianos
 O anthropos pou gyrise apo ti zesti (1972) as Loukas Bobolas
 O anthropos pou espage plaka! (1972) as Lazaros Hatziflokas
 O fantasmenos (1973) as Makis Karasinis
 Agapi mou pagovouno (1974)
 Ekeines Kai Ego (1976, TV Series)
 Treles epafes rwmeikou tupou (1978)
 O Labroukos ballader (1981) as Labros Komninos (final appearance)

References

External links

1913 births
1985 deaths
Greek male film actors
Male actors from Athens
20th-century Greek male actors
Greek male stage actors
Greek comedians
20th-century comedians